Song of Idaho is a 1948 American Western musical film directed by Ray Nazarro. It was released by Columbia Pictures.

Plot
King Russell (Kirby Grant) is a hillbilly singer whose show is canceled by its sponsor. The Hoosier Hot Shots and Russell must try to win over the sponsor's young son in order to get the sponsor to change his mind.

Cast
 The Hoosier Hotshots as Musicians
 Paul Trietsch as Hotshot Hezzie
 Ken Trietsch as Hotshot Ken
 Gil Taylor as Hotshot Gil
 Charles Ward as Hotshot Gabe
 Kirby Grant as King Russell
 June Vincent as Eve Allen
 Tommy Ivo as Junior Nottingham
 Dorothy Vaughan as Sara Mom Russell
 Emory Parnell as J. Chester Nottingham
 The Sunshine Boys as Musicians
 The Sunshine Girls as Singing Trio
 The Starlighters as Singing Quintet

Music
The film features the musical quartet Hoosier Hot Shots (Paul Trietsch, Ken Trietsch, Gil Taylor, Charles Ward) who also star as actors. The Sunshine Boys also provide music, and the Sunshine Girls and the Starlighters sing.

Songs performed in Song of Idaho include:
"Idaho, Here We Come"
"I'm Sorry I Didn't Say I'm Sorry"
""Rocky Mountain Express"
"Here Comes The Cheer Parade"
"Idaho"
"Driftin'" 
"Nobody Else but You" 
"Rhythm of the River"
"Sippin' Cider by the Zuyder Zee" 
"When the Lightning Struck Coon Creek"

References

External links

1948 films
American Western (genre) musical films
Country music films
1940s Western (genre) musical films
Columbia Pictures films
American black-and-white films
Films directed by Ray Nazarro
1940s American films